A Kanak war club is a traditional weapon (mace) of the Kanak tribes of New Caledonia.

Uses
Usually cut from a hardwood type of iron wood, gaiac or kohu they were used for war. Like all the Pacific clubs, their forms were of a very wide variety and specific to each country and each purpose. They were found in phallic form, but also in the form of fungus or bird’s beak. Their striking head consisted of a root knot. These weapons were originally decorated with plants, human hair, or cloths, and were wielded with one or two hands.

Oceanian art specialist Roger Boulay makes a distinction between a mace, that is "an object whose percussion point is in the axis of the handle" and a club, that is "an object whose percussion point is shifted in relation to this axis".

The Kanak called the "bird beak" club a "turtle beak".

Gallery

See also
 Kanak
 Melanesia

References

Bibliography
 John Charles Edler, Terence Barrow, Art of Polynesia, Hemmeter Publishing Corporation, 1990.
 Roger Boulay, Casse-Tête et Massues Kanak, 2015.
 Adrienne L. Kaeppler, Douglas Newton, Harry N. Abrams, Oceanic Art, 1997.
 Michael Gunn, William Teel, From the South Seas: Oceanic Art in the Teel Collection, Museum of Fine Arts, Boston, MFA Publications, 2006.
 André Breton, Arts primitifs, Camels Cohen, 2002.
 De jade et de nacre: patrimoine artistique kanak : Catalogue, Musée territorial de Nouvelle-Calédonie, Nouméa, mars-mai 1990, Musée national des arts africains et océaniens, Paris, octobre 1990-janvier 1991.

New Caledonia
Throwing clubs
Clubs (weapon)
Primitive weapons
Ritual weapons